The 1985 Ohio Bobcats football team was an American football team that represented Ohio University in the Mid-American Conference (MAC) during the 1985 NCAA Division I-A football season. In their first season under head coach Cleve Bryant, the Bobcats compiled a 2–9 record (2–7 against MAC opponents), finished in last place in the MAC, and were outscored by all opponents by a combined total of 305 to 181.  They played their home games in Peden Stadium in Athens, Ohio.

Schedule

References

Ohio
Ohio Bobcats football seasons
Ohio Bobcats football